Dallas Airport can refer to several airports in Dallas, Texas:
 Dallas/Fort Worth International Airport (IATA: DFW ; ICAO: KDFW)
 Dallas Love Field (IATA: DAL ; ICAO: KDAL)
 Dallas Executive Airport (IATA: RBD ; ICAO: KRBD) 
 Naval Air Station Dallas

See also